Bluewater Shopping Centre (commonly referred to as Bluewater) is an out-of-town shopping centre in Stone (postally Greenhithe), Kent, England, outside the M25 motorway,  east south east of London's centre. Opened on 16 March 1999 in a former chalk quarry after ten years of building works, the site (including car parks) occupies  and has a sales floor area of 154,000 m2 (1,600,000 ft2) over three levels, making it the fifth-largest shopping centre in the UK (after Westfield London, MetroCentre, Trafford Centre and Westfield Stratford City). Elsewhere in Europe only Istanbul's Cevahir Mall and Vienna's (Vösendorf) Shopping City Süd are bigger. The floor plan is a triangular shape with 330 stores, including 3 anchors, 40 cafés and restaurants, and a 17-screen cinema. The centre employs 7,000 people and serves over  visitors a year.

It is owned by three major UK institutions: Landsec (55%), Prudential and PRUPIM (35%) and Hermes (10%).

History
The Secretary of State granted planning permission for the centre in 1990 following an earlier planning inquiry. In 1994, quarry operator Blue Circle approached Australian mall developer Lendlease to form a partnership. Instead, Lend Lease bought the land and the project from Blue Circle, and under the leadership of its CEO Peter Walichnowski gathered a group of major investors, which included: Prudential, Barclays Mercantile, Hermes (acting for Britel), Lloyds Leasing, and Royal Bank Leasing. Lendlease also formed a pool of minor investors, called the Lend Lease Retail Partnership, with 18 institutions and corporations.

That gave Bluewater credibility to sign more names, including the two other anchor stores: House of Fraser followed in June 1996 by Marks & Spencer. 90% of the retail space was committed by March 1998.

Construction, undertaken by Bovis, started on 1 May 1996. At its peak, the site employed 2,500 workers simultaneously. In all, 20,000 people worked  hours on the construction of Bluewater. At the planned opening date, 16 March 1999, Bluewater was inaugurated with 99% of the shops open for business. The total cost of construction was around GBP £400 million.

In May 2005, Bluewater introduced a code of conduct to ban swearing, clothing that obscures the face (including hoods and baseball caps), and groups of more than five without the intention to shop.  The policy has divided opinion, although Tony Blair did show support. In December 2021 Lendlease sold its 25% shareholding to Landsec.

Redevelopments and expansions
With further expansion and development in the shopping centre industry since Bluewater's opening in 1999, perhaps most prominently the entry of Westfield London and Westfield Stratford City into the market, Bluewater has looked to make changes to its offering to keep the centre up to date and provide new and additional customer experiences. Numerous stores have been refurbished, expanded or relocated in recent years as the centre looks to expand and upgrade its mix of retailers, and there have been some major construction projects, mostly centred on the three leisure/dining 'villages', undertaken or proposed.

In late 2006, Dartford Borough Council granted planning permission for Bluewater to build a two-story events venue of 5200 m2, and further extend the south side of the centre. Construction on the extension began in early 2010, and when completed in 2011 the expansion added more restaurants to the Plaza (formerly Water Circus) section, including a Jamie's Italian, Wagamamas and Browns. The new Glow events centre opened as part of the extension spans two floors, and has held events such as the BBC's Good Food Show: Spring. However, due to low visitors, Glow was closed in 2016, with the space being converted to extra cinema screens, a second Pizza Express restaurant, Creams Dessert Parlour, Rosa's Thai Cafe and Dinotropolis adventure play area on the Upper Level, and a GraVity Trampoline Park on the Lower Level. The events venue was developed alongside the existing entertainment provision in this area, the Showcase cinema which has been present in this area (initially as a Hoyts multiplex) since the opening of Bluewater.

During 2012, the Wintergarden food court area off Rose Gallery was extensively refurbished. Much of the food court was closed for part of the year to enable the work, with McDonald's notably unavailable at Bluewater throughout the period, though the Pizza Hut, Nando's restaurants to the far side of the area (by the centre entrance), and the Ponti's restaurant on the upper mall, remained open during the works. KFC relocated to Thames Walk to continue to trade during the development. When the Wintergarden works completed in October 2012, McDonald's, KFC and Harry Ramsden's returned to their post, along with several new food outlets, most significantly a new Giraffe restaurant which had been constructed adjacent McDonald's. The previous large 'castle'-style McDonald's was replaced with a simple serving counter.

A proposal was put forward in early 2013 to expand the West Village dining and specialist retail area currently sited off the Guildhall. This currently comprises a Waterstones bookshop, a training and recruitment facility, and Costa Coffee shop on the upper mall, and on the lower mall a row of boutique retailers including The Daily Grind, Mr Simms Olde Sweet Shop, Gusto & Daisy's Dog Emporium leading out to a suite of restaurants including Carluccio's, PizzaExpress and Loch Fyne Restaurants amongst others. The proposal would see much of the existing infrastructure demolished and replaced with a new larger two-level 'specialist retail' area, similar to 'The Village' at Westfield London, with upmarket retail and restaurant facilities and mall access to both levels. Existing businesses would have to be relocated or removed from the centre to allow the works to go ahead.

The centre is visited by over 27 million people a year and employs around 7,000 people.

Architecture

The principal architect was Eric Kuhne. Other firms involved in the design and branding were Benoy, BDG McColl, RTKO, Henrion Ludlow & Schmidt and Minale Tattersfield.

The main building is a triangle of three malls: Thames Walk, Guildhall and Rose Gallery, with one anchor store at each corner. Curved and tapered glass sections form the roofing over each mall, providing significant natural lighting. The roof vents are inspired by Kentish oast houses.

There are statues of historic trades along the walls above the upper level.

Transport
There are over 13,000 free parking spaces, in six car parks.

Rail
The nearest railway station to Bluewater is Greenhithe for Bluewater, 1.7 miles away. It is served by Southeastern and Thameslink trains to Luton, London Cannon Street, London Charing Cross, London Victoria, Gravesend and Rainham.

Buses
Arriva Southern Counties (including Fastrack A and B), Go Coach, Ensignbus, National Express and London Buses routes serve Bluewater bus station.

References

External links 

 
 Bluewater on The Retail Database

Shopping centres in Kent
Borough of Dartford
Shopping malls established in 1999
Prudential plc
Lendlease
1999 establishments in England